Daphne Blake Oram (31 December 1925 – 5 January 2003) was a British composer and electronic musician. She was one of the first British composers to produce electronic sound, and was an early practitioner of musique concrète in the UK. As a co-founder of the BBC Radiophonic Workshop, she was central to the development of British electronic music. Her uncredited scoring work on the 1961 film The Innocents helped to pioneer the electronic soundtrack.

Oram was the creator of the Oramics technique for creating electronic sounds using drawn sound. Besides being a musical innovator, she was the first woman to independently direct and set up a personal electronic music studio, and the first woman to design and construct an electronic musical instrument. In her book An Individual Note of Music, Sound and Electronics (1971) she explored philosophical themes related to the physics of sound.

Early life and education 
Oram was born to James and Ida Oram on 31 December 1925 in Wiltshire, England. Educated at Sherborne School for Girls, she was, from an early age, taught piano and organ as well as musical composition. Her father was the President of the Wiltshire Archeological Society in the 1950s. Her childhood home was within 10 miles of the stone circles of Avebury and 20 miles from Stonehenge.

Career

Work at the BBC 
In 1942, Oram was offered a place at the Royal College of Music but instead took up a position as a Junior Studio Engineer and "music balancer" at the BBC. One of her job responsibilities was "shadowing" live concerts with a pre-recorded version so the broadcast would go on if interrupted by "enemy action". Other job duties included creating sound effects for radio shows and mixing broadcast levels. During this period she became aware of developments in synthetic sound and began experimenting with tape recorders. Often staying after hours, she was known to experiment with tape recorders late into the night. She recorded sounds on to tape, and then cut, spliced and looped, slowed them down, sped up, and played them backwards.

She also dedicated time in the 1940s composing music, including an orchestral work entitled Still Point. This was an innovative piece for turntables, "double orchestra" and five microphones. Many consider Still Point the first composition that combined acoustic orchestration with live electronic manipulation. Rejected by the BBC and never performed, Still Point remained unheard for 70 years, until on 24 June 2016 Shiva Feshareki and the London Contemporary Orchestra performed it for the first time. Following the discovery of the finalised score, the premiere of the revised version of Still Point was performed at The Proms in London on 23 July 2018 by composers Shiva Feshareki and James Bulley - who realised the composition following Oram's notes - alongside the London Contemporary Orchestra.

In the 1950s, she was promoted to become a music studio manager. Following a trip to the RTF studios in Paris, she began to campaign for the BBC to provide electronic music facilities for composing sounds and music, using electronic music and musique concrète techniques, for use in its programming. In 1957 she was commissioned to compose music for the play Amphitryon 38.  She created this piece using a sine wave oscillator, a tape recorder and some self-designed filters, thereby producing the first wholly electronic score in BBC history. Along with fellow electronic musician and BBC colleague Desmond Briscoe, she began to receive commissions for many other works, including a significant production of Samuel Beckett's All That Fall (1957). As demand grew for these electronic sounds, the BBC gave Oram and Briscoe a budget to establish the BBC Radiophonic Workshop in early 1958, where she was the first Studio Manager. The workshop was focused on creating sound effects and theme music for all of the corporation's output, including the science fiction serial Quatermass and the Pit (1958–59) and "Major Bloodnok's Stomach" for the radio comedy series The Goon Show.

In October 1958, Oram was sent by the BBC to the "Journées Internationales de Musique Expérimentale" at the Brussels World's Fair (where Edgard Varèse demonstrated his Poème électronique). After hearing some of the work produced by her contemporaries and being unhappy at the BBC music department's continued refusal to push electronic composition into the foreground of their activities, she decided to resign from the BBC less than one year after the workshop had opened, hoping to develop her techniques further on her own.

In 1965, Oram produced Pulse Persephone for the Treasures of the Commonwealth exhibition at the Royal Academy of the Arts.

Film 
Oram provided the prominent electronic sounds for the soundtrack of Dr. No (1962) from her six-minute work Atoms in Space, but she was not credited in the film. These sounds were used by the James Bond films up until Goldfinger (1964). Oram also added sounds to the soundtrack of Snow (1963), a short documentary by Geoffrey Jones. After the success of Snow, she worked with Jones again and is credited for the Electronic Treatment (of music) of Rail (1967).

Oramics 

Immediately after leaving the BBC in 1959, Oram began setting up her Oramics Studios for Electronic Composition in Tower Folly, a converted oast house at Fairseat, near Wrotham, Kent.

Oramics is a drawn sound technique that involves drawing directly onto 35mm film stock. Shapes and designs etched into the film strips are read by photo-electric cells and transformed into sounds.  According to Oram, "Every nuance, every subtlety of phrasing, every tone gradation or pitch inflection must be possible just by a change in the written form." The Oramics technique and the flexibility of control over the nuances of sound was an altogether new and innovative approach to music production. Financial pressures meant it was necessary to maintain her work as a commercial composer, and her work on the Oramics system covered a wider range than the Radiophonic Workshop. She produced music for not only radio and television but also theatre, short commercial films, sound installations and exhibitions. Other work from this studio included electronic sounds for Jack Clayton's horror film The Innocents (1961), concert works including Four Aspects (1960), and collaborations with opera composer Thea Musgrave and Ivor Walsworth.

In February 1962, she was awarded a grant of £3,550 from the Gulbenkian Foundation to support the development of the Oramics system. A second Gulbenkian grant of £1,000 was awarded in 1965. The first entirely drawn-sound composition using the machine, entitled "Contrasts Essonic", was recorded in 1963. As the Oramics research evolved, Oram's focus turned to the subtle nuances and interactions between sonic parameters. In this phase of Oramics, she applied her sound research to the non-linear behavior of the human ear and to perception of the brain's apprehension of the world. She used Oramics to study vibrational phenomena, divided into "commercial Oramics" and "mystical Oramics." In her notes, Oram defined Oramics as "the study of sound and its relationship to life."

In the 1980s Oram worked on the development of a software version of Oramics for the Acorn Archimedes computer using grant money received from the RVW (Ralph Vaughan Williams) Trust. She wished to continue her "Mystical Oramics" research, but a lack of funding prevented this project from being fully realized.

Written works 
Throughout her career, Oram lectured on electronic music and studio techniques. Her book, An Individual Note of Music, Sound and Electronics (1971), investigates the physics of sound and the emergence of electronic music in a philosophical manner. A new edition was published in December 2016.

In the late 1970s, Oram began a second book, which survives in manuscript, titled The Sound of the Past - A Resonating Speculation. In this manuscript she speculates on archaeological acoustics, and presents a theory backed by research that suggests that Neolithic chambered mounds and ancient sites like Stonehenge and The Great Pyramid in Egypt were used as resonators. She said that her research suggested that the ancients may have possessed acute knowledge about the properties of sound in long-distance communication.

Death 
In the 1990s, Oram suffered two strokes and was forced to stop working, later moving to a nursing home. She died on 5 January 2003 at age 77.

Archive 
After Oram's death a large archive relating to her life's work passed to the composer Hugh Davies. When he died in 2005, this material passed to the Sonic Arts Network. In 2008 the archive went to Goldsmiths, University of London and is now held within Goldsmiths Special Collections & Archives in the library, where it is open for public access and ongoing research. The launch of the archive was celebrated with a symposium and a series of concerts at the Southbank Centre. This included a concert of newly reworked versions of material from the collection by music collage artist People Like Us.

In 2007, a compilation of her music, entitled Oramics, was released.

In 2008, a BBC Radio 3 documentary on Oram's life was broadcast as part of the Sunday Feature strand, entitled Wee Have Also Sound-Houses.

Legacy 
Her work at the Radiophonic Workshop also helped pave the way for Delia Derbyshire, who arrived at the BBC in 1960 and later co-created the original Doctor Who theme music.

She furthered music philosophy in her writings, and dedicated time to considering the human element in connection to sound and resonant frequencies. In her unfinished manuscript, The Sound of the Past, a Resonating Speculation, she postulated that ancient civilizations might have done this to a highly evolved degree. In a letter to Sir George Trevelyan, Oram expressed hope that her wide-ranging work on Oramics would plant seeds that would mature in the 21st century.

The Daphne Oram Creative Arts Building at Canterbury Christ Church University was opened in 2019.

Click tribute

In its first show of 2012, the BBC television technology programme, Click, featured a piece about Daphne Oram and her synthesiser, mainly prompted by the three-part Oramics Machine being on display at the Science Museum, London, during a year-long exhibition on the history of electronic music. It showed the machine being installed in a large display cabinet, and described how it was no longer possible to play due to its fragile state. However, an interactive, virtual version of the machine has been created, which allows visitors to create their own compositions. The programme showed archive footage of Oram describing the process of what became Oramics, also showing her 'drawing' the music, then playing her machine. The piece was entirely positive and described her as an 'unsung hero' of electronic music.

Daphne Oram's Wonderful World of Sound 
Daphne Oram's Wonderful World of Sound is a play that detailed Oram's life and career. It was presented by Blood of the Young and Tron Theatre. The play premiered in Glasgow on 9 May 2017 and toured around Scotland from May 2017 to June 2017. The play was written by Isobel McArthur and directed by Paul Brotherston. It was live-scored by Anneke Kampman, a Scottish electronic sound artist.

The Oram Awards 
The Oram Awards was launched by the PRS Foundation and the New BBC Radiophonic Workshop to celebrate "emerging artists in the fields of music, sound and related technologies in honour of Daphne Oram, and other pioneering women in music and sound." The inaugural Oram Awards took place on 3 July 2017 at the Turner Contemporary in Margate, as a part of the Oscillate Festival of Experimental Music And Sound. Two female innovators received the highest reward of £1,000, while six other female innovators received £500.

Discography
 "Electronic Sound Patterns" (1962), single, also included on Listen, Move and Dance Volume 1 from same year with work from Vera Gray
 Oramics (2007), compilation on Paradigm Discs
 "Spaceship UK: The Untold Story of the British Space Programme" (2010), promotional 7" split single with Belbury Poly
 Private Dreams and Public Nightmares (2011), remix album by Andrea Parker and Daz Quayle on Aperture
 The Oram Tapes: Volume 1 (2011), compilation on Young Americans
 Sound Houses (2014), remix album by Walls
 Pop Tryouts (2015), mini album on cassette and download on Was Ist Das?

Publication
 
Second edition, 2016, Anomie Publishing 
Third edition, 2020, The Daphne Oram Trust and Anomie Publishing

Notes

References

External links

 Daphne Oram archived website
 Daphne Oram archived catalogue
 
 Daphne Oram and "Oramics", 120years.net
 "Daphne Oram: Portrait of an electronic music pioneer" from The Guardian
 BBC News story: "Daphne Oram, the unsung pioneer of techno"
 
 
 

1925 births
2003 deaths
BBC Radiophonic Workshop
English experimental musicians
English electronic musicians
English composers
British women composers
People from Devizes
People educated at Sherborne Girls
English women in electronic music
Graphical sound
20th-century English women musicians
Women audio engineers
Early Recording Engineers (1930-1959)
People from Wrotham